is a Japanese actor. In 2004, he became the youngest winner of the Best Actor award in the history of the Cannes Film Festival for his portrayal of 12-year-old Akira in the highly acclaimed Nobody Knows.

Career
Yagira was 12 years old and not a professional actor, when filming began for Nobody Knows in 2002. He then immediately went on to television projects and other films. He co-starred with Eriko Sato in Akane Yamada's All to the Sea which was released in 2010 and co-starred with Kie Kitano in Taro Hyugaji's Under the Nagasaki Sky, released in 2013. 

In 2021, Yagira played young Takeshi Kitano in the biopic Asakusa Kid.

Personal life
Yagira was hospitalized on August 29, 2008 for a drug overdose, with early reports calling it a suicide attempt.  Yagira later denied that he had been trying to kill himself, noting that he was the one who called an ambulance after he began feeling ill from taking the pills.  According to his blog: 

On January 15, 2010, Yuya Yagira married TV personality Ellie Toyota at Tokyo's Meiji Shrine. They had registered their marriage on January 14.

Brand endorsements
In 2018, Yagira became the brand ambassador for Japanese men's grooming brand GATSBY. He starred in the TV Commercial "GATSBY Cop", together with popular Japanese actor Mackenyu Arata.

Filmography

Television
 Kunimitsu no Matsuri (KTV, 2003), Shinsaku Sakagami
 Denchi ga Kireru Made (TV Asahi, 2004), Daichi Takano
 Tokyo23: Survival City (WOWOW, 2010), Noboru Arai
 Lady: Saigo no Hanzai Profile, episodes 4, 5 (TBS, 2011), Satoshi Tatsumi
 Galileo XX (Fuji TV, 2013), Kento Tōma
 Aoi Honō (TV Tokyo, 2014), Moyuru Honoo
 Nobunaga Concerto, episode 1 (Fuji TV, 2014), Oda Nobuyuki
 Nurses of the Palace (TBS, 2015), Kōtarō Nakano
 Mare (NHK, Asadora, 2015), Daisuke Ikehata
 We're Millennial Got a Problem? (NTV, 2016), Maribu Michigami 
 The Brave Yoshihiko and The Seven Driven People (TV Tokyo, 2016), Yuusha Yoshihiko 
 Naotora: The Lady Warlord (NHK, Taiga Drama,  2017), Ryūun-maru
 Mom, May I Quit Being Your Daughter? (NHK, 2017), Taichi Matsushima
 Frankenstein's Love (NTV, 2017), Seiya Inaniwa
 Gintama: Mitsuba hen (dTV, 2017), Toshiro Hijikata
 Gintama of the Unusual (dTV, 2018), Toshiro Hijikata 
 From Today, It's My Turn, episode 3 (NTV, 2018), Moyuru Honoo
 A Day-Off of Kasumi Arimura, episode 4 (Wowow, 2020), Kevin Takeda
 Gift of Fire (NHK, 2020), Osamu Ishimura
 Pay to Ace (NTV, 2021), Kurodo Kuroki
 Gannibal (Disney+, 2022), Daigo Agawa

Film
 Nobody Knows (2004), Akira Fukushima
 Shining Boy and Little Randy (2005)
 Sugar and Spice (2006), Shiro Yamashita 
 The Bandage Club (2007)
 The Shock Labyrinth 3D (2009)
 All to the Sea (2010)
 Under the Nagasaki Sky (2013), Goro Sawada
 Unforgiven (2013), Yuichi Hirose
 Again (2013), Ryutaro
 Crows Explode (2014), Toru Gora
 Ushijima the Loan Shark 2 (2014), Ebinuma 
 Saiga no Inochi (2014), Keito Myose
 Gassoh (2015), Kiwamu Akitsu
 Destruction Babies (2016), Taira Ashihara
 Hentai Kamen: Abnormal Crisis (2016), Tadashi Makoto
 Pink and Gray (2016), Shingo Suzuki
 Ninkyo Yaro (2016)
 Grab the Sun (2016)
 Gintama (2017), Toshiro Hijikata
 Samurai's Promise (2018), Chiri Tsubaki
 Hibiki (2018), Kohei Tanaka
 Gintama 2 (2018), Toshiro Hijikata
 His Lost Name (2019), Shichi
 The Fable (2019), Kojima
 Don't Cry, Mr. Ogre (2019), Tomoyuki Saito 
 Doraemon: Nobita's Chronicle of the Moon Exploration (2019)
 From Today, It's My Turn the Movie (2020), Eiji Yanagi
 Hokusai (2021), Hokusai Katsushika (young)
 Gift of Fire (2021), Osamu Ishimura
 Under the Turquoise Sky (2021), Takeshi
 Asakusa Kid (2021), Takeshi Kitano
 The Fish Tale (2022), Hiyo

Awards
2004: 57th Cannes Film Festival - Best Actor for Nobody Knows
2004: 90th Kinema Junpo Award - Best New Actor for Nobody Knows
2005: 26th Yokohama Film Festival - Best New Actor for Nobody Knows
2016: Drama Academy Awards - Best Supporting Actor for We're Millennials. Got a problem?
2017: 90th Kinema Junpo Award - Best Actor for Destruction Babies
2017: 38th Yokohama Film Festival - Best Actor for Destruction Babies
2022: 46th Elan d'or Awards - Newcomer of the Year

References

External links
 
 

1990 births
Living people
21st-century Japanese male actors
Japanese male child actors
Japanese male film actors
Male actors from Tokyo
People from Western Tokyo
Stardust Promotion artists
Cannes Film Festival Award for Best Actor winners
Horikoshi High School alumni